Puerto Rico Highway 864 (PR-864) is an east–west road located in Bayamón, Puerto Rico. Located south of PR-2, the entire road is located in Hato Tejas barrio. This route intersects with PR-2 at its eastern and western terminus, and bring access to several neighborhoods of the western area of Bayamón.

Major intersections

See also

 List of highways numbered 864

References

External links
 

864
Bayamón, Puerto Rico